Chiewkwee's horseshoe bat (Rhinolophus chiewkweeae) is a species of horseshoe bat endemic to the Malay Peninsula.

References

Rhinolophidae
Mammals of Malaysia
Mammals described in 2005
Bats of Southeast Asia